Alligator Creek is a rural locality in the City of Townsville, Queensland, Australia.

Geography

The locality is bounded on the north by the Bruce Highway. The North Coast railway line is aligned with part of the northern boundary (but mostly runs just north of the boundary in Nome).

As the locality name suggests, Alligator Creek flows through the locality from the south-east (Mount Elliott) to the north (Nome). It eventually enters Cleveland Bay within the locality of Cape Cleveland.

Killymoon is a neighbourhood in the north-east of the locality. Killymoon Creek runs through that area.

History

Amenities 
The Townsville City Council operate a mobile library service which visits Parkland Road at Alligator Creek every second Wednesday morning.

The Gator Girls branch of the Queensland Country Women's Association meets at the Alligator Creek Community & Sports Club at 10 Parklane Road.

Education 
There are no schools in Alligator Creek. The nearest primary school is Wulguru State School in Wulguru to the north-west. The nearest secondary school is William Ross State High School in Annandale to the north-west.

References

External links
 

Suburbs of Townsville
City of Townsville
Localities in Queensland